United States congressional apportionment is the process by which seats in the United States House of Representatives are distributed among the 50 states according to the most recent decennial census mandated by the United States Constitution. Each state is apportioned a number of seats which approximately corresponds to its share of the aggregate population of the 50 states. Every state is constitutionally guaranteed at least one seat in the House and two seats in the Senate, regardless of population.

The number of voting seats in the House of Representatives has been 435 since 1913, capped at that number by the Reapportionment Act of 1929—except for a temporary (1959–1962) increase to 437 when Alaska and Hawaii were admitted into the Union. The Huntington–Hill method of equal proportions has been used to distribute the seats among the states since the 1940 census reapportionment. Federal law requires the Clerk of the United States House of Representatives to notify each state government of the number of seats apportioned to the state no later than January 25 of the year immediately following each decennial census.

The size of a state's total congressional delegation (which in addition to representative(s) includes 2 senators for each state) also determines the size of its representation in the U.S. Electoral College, which elects the U.S. president.

Constitutional context

Article One, Section 2, Clause 3 of the United States Constitution initially provided:

Following the end of the Civil War, the first of those provisions was superseded by Section 2 of the Fourteenth Amendment:

Reapportionment
Reapportionments normally occur following each decennial census, though the law that governs the total number of representatives and the method of apportionment to be carried into force at that time are enacted prior to the census.

The decennial apportionment also determines the size of each state's representation in the U.S. Electoral College. Under Article II, Section 1, Clause 2 of the U.S. Constitution, the number of electors of any state equals the size of its total congressional delegation (House and Senate seats).

Federal law requires the Clerk of the House of Representatives to notify each state government no later than January 25 of the year immediately following the census of the number of seats to which it is entitled. Whether or not the number of seats has changed, the state determines the boundaries of congressional districts—geographical areas within the state of approximately equal population—in a process called redistricting.

Because the deadline for the House Clerk to report the results does not occur until the following January, and the states need sufficient time to perform the redistricting, the decennial census does not affect the elections that are held during that same year. For example, the electoral college apportionment and congressional races during the 2020 presidential election year were still based on the 2010 census results; all of the newly redrawn districts based on the 2020 census did not finally come into force until the 2022 midterm election winners were inaugurated in January 2023.

Number of members

The size of the U.S. House of Representatives refers to the total number of congressional districts (or seats) into which the land area of the United States proper has been divided. The number of voting representatives is currently set at 435. There are an additional five delegates to the House of Representatives. They represent the District of Columbia and the territories of American Samoa, Guam, the Northern Mariana Islands, which first elected a representative in 2008, and the U.S. Virgin Islands. Puerto Rico also elects a resident commissioner every four years.

Controversy and history
Since 1789, when the United States Congress first convened under the Constitution, the number of citizens per congressional district has risen from an average of 33,000 in 1790 to over 700,000 . Prior to the 20th century, the number of representatives increased every decade as more states joined the union, and the population increased.

The ideal number of members has been a contentious issue since the country's founding. George Washington agreed that the original representation proposed during the Constitutional Convention (one representative for every 40,000) was inadequate and supported an alteration to reduce that number to 30,000. This was the only time that Washington pronounced an opinion on any of the actual issues debated during the entire convention. Five years later, Washington was so insistent on having no more than 30,000 constituents per representative that he exercised the first presidential veto in history on a bill which allowed half states to go over the quota.

In Federalist No. 55, James Madison argued that the size of the House of Representatives has to balance the ability of the body to legislate with the need for legislators to have a relationship close enough to the people to understand their local circumstances, that such representatives' social class be low enough to sympathize with the feelings of the mass of the people, and that their power be diluted enough to limit their abuse of the public trust and interests.

Madison also addressed Anti-Federalist claims that the representation would be inadequate, arguing that the major inadequacies are of minimal inconvenience since these will be cured rather quickly by virtue of decennial reapportionment. He noted, however,

Madison argued against the assumption that more is better:

Global comparison and disparities 
When talking about the populations within California's reapportioned House districts in 1951, a report from Duke University found that "[there] is not an excessive disparity in district populations, but [the populations and disparities are] perhaps larger than necessary." If the House continued to expand as it did prior to the Reapportionment Act of 1929, it would currently have 1,156 members (still just the second largest lower house, after China). This would give the representatives, on average, about 287 thousand constituents, on par with Japan's National Diet. 

The United States also has comparatively massive constituencies for OECD members, with almost three times more constituents per legislator on average than Japan and Mexico. The U.S. has the third most populous average legislative districts in the world (second if the EU's European Parliament is not included).

Membership cap
The Apportionment Act of 1911 (Public Law 62-5) raised the membership of the U.S. House to 433 and provided for an apportionment. It also provided for additional seats upon the admissions of Arizona and New Mexico as states, increasing the number to 435 in 1912.

In 1921, Congress failed to reapportion the House membership as required by the United States Constitution. This failure to reapportion may have been politically motivated, as the newly elected Republican majority may have feared the effect such a reapportionment would have on their future electoral prospects. A reapportionment in 1921 in the traditional fashion would have increased the size of the House to 483 seats, but many members would have lost their seats due to the population shifts, and the House chamber did not have adequate seats for 483 members. By 1929, no reapportionment had been made since 1911, and there was vast representational inequity, measured by the average district size. By 1929 some states had districts twice as large as others due to population growth and demographic shift.

In 1929 Congress (with Republican control of both houses of Congress and the presidency) passed the Reapportionment Act of 1929 which capped the size of the House at 435 (the then current number) and established a permanent method for apportioning a constant 435 seats. This cap has remained unchanged since then, except for a temporary increase to 437 members upon the 1959 admission of Alaska and Hawaii into the Union.

Two states, Wyoming and Vermont, have populations smaller than the average for a single district, although neither state has fewer people than the least populous congressional districts.

Proposed expansion
Among the Bill of Rights amendments to the United States Constitution proposed by Congress in 1789, was one addressing the number of seats in the House. It attempted to set a pattern for growth of the House along with the population, but has not been ratified.

With the nation's population reaching approximately 308.7 million according to the 2010 census, the proposed amendment would have called for an up-to 6,000-member House.

One proposal to alleviate the current constituency disparities and the high average number of constituents in many states' congressional districts is the "Wyoming rule." Operating similar to New Zealand's method of allocation for proportional representation, it would give the least populous state (which has been Wyoming since 1990) one representative and then create districts in other states with the same population.

Another proposed expansion rule, the cube root rule, calls for the membership of the legislature to be based on the cube root (rounded up) of the U.S. population at the last census. For example, such a rule would call for 692 members of the House based on the 2020 United States census. An additional House member would be added each time the national population exceeds the next cube; in this case, the next House member would be added when the census population reached 331,373,889, and the one after that at 332,812,558. A variation would split the representation between the House and the Senate, e.g. 592 members in the House (692 − 100 senators). 

On May 21, 2001, Rep. Alcee Hastings sent a dear colleague letter pointing out that U.S. expansion of its legislature had not kept pace with other countries.

It was passed by the House, but was tripped up by procedural hurdles in the Senate and withdrawn from consideration. In February 2009 the Senate adopted the measure 61–37. In April 2010, however, House leaders decided to shelve the proposal.

Holmes Norton's bill previously passed the House during the  but not the Senate.

Apportionment methods

Apart from the requirement that each state is to be entitled to at least one representative in the House of Representatives, the number of representatives in each state is in principle to be proportional to its population. Since the adoption of the Constitution, five distinct apportionment methods have been used.

The first apportionment was contained in Art. I, § 2, cl. 3 of the Constitution. After the first census in 1790, Congress passed the Apportionment Act of 1792 and adopted the Jefferson method to apportion U.S. representatives to the states based on population. The Jefferson method required fractional remainders to be discarded when calculating each state's total number of U.S. representatives and was used until the 1830 census. The Webster method,  proposed in 1832 by Daniel Webster and adopted for the 1840 census, allocated an additional representative to states with a fractional remainder greater than 0.5. The Hamilton/Vinton (largest remainder) method was used from 1850 until 1900. The Vinton or Hamilton method was shown to be susceptible to an apportionment paradox. The Apportionment Act of 1911, in addition to setting the number of U.S. representatives at 435, returned to the Webster method, which was used following the 1910 and 1930 censuses (no reapportionment was done after the 1920 census). The current method, known as the Huntington–Hill method or method of equal proportions, was adopted in 1941 for reapportionment based on the 1940 census and beyond. The revised method was necessary in the context of the cap on the number of representatives set in the Reapportionment Act of 1929.

The method of equal proportions
 
The apportionment method currently used is the method of equal proportions, which minimizes the percentage differences in the number of people per representative among the different states. The resulting apportionment is optimal in the sense that any additional transfer of a seat from one state to another would result in larger percentage differences.

In this method, as a first step, each of the 50 states is given its one guaranteed seat in the House of Representatives, leaving 385 seats to assign. The remaining seats are allocated one at a time, to the state with the highest priority number. Thus, the 51st seat would go to the most populous state (currently California). The priority number is determined by the ratio of the state population to the geometric mean of the number of seats it currently holds in the assignment process, n (initially 1), and the number of seats it would hold if the seat were assigned to it, n+1. Symbolically, the priority number An is

where P is the population of the state, and n is the number of seats it currently holds before the possible allocation of the next seat.  An equivalent, recursive definition is

where n is still the number of seats the state has before allocation of the next (in other words, for the mth allocation, n = m-1, where m > 1), and for n = 1, the initial A1 is explicitly defined by the non-recursive formula as

Consider the reapportionment following the 2010 U.S. census: beginning with all states initially being allocated one seat, the largest value of A1 corresponds to the largest state, California, which is allocated seat 51. After being allocated its 2nd seat, its priority value decreases to its A2 value, which is reordered to a position back in line. The 52nd seat goes to Texas, the 2nd largest state, because its A1 priority value is larger than the An of any other state. However, the 53rd seat goes back to California because its A2 priority value is larger than the An of any other state. The 54th seat goes to New York because its A1 priority value is larger than the An of any other state at this point. This process continues until all remaining seats are assigned. Each time a state is assigned a seat, n is incremented by 1, causing its priority value to be reduced and reordered among the states, whereupon another state normally rises to the top of the list.

The 2010 census ranking of priority values shows the order in which seats 51–435 were apportioned after the 2010 census, with additional listings for the next five priorities. Minnesota was allocated the final (435th) seat. North Carolina missed its 14th seat by 15,754 residents as the 436th seat to be allocated; ten years earlier it had gained its 13th seat as the 435th seat to be allocated based on the 2000 census.

The 2020 census ranking of priority values shows the order in which seats 51–435 were apportioned after the 2020 census, with additional listings for the next ten priorities. For the second time in a row, Minnesota was allocated the final (435th) seat. If either New York had registered 89 more residents or Minnesota had registered 26 fewer residents, New York would have been allocated the 435th seat instead.

Past apportionments
Note: The first apportionment was established by the Constitution based on population estimates made by the Philadelphia Convention, and was not based on any census or enumeration.

 indicates the largest number of representatives each state has had.

Changes following the 2010 censuses

On December 21, 2010, the U.S. Census Bureau released its official apportionment results for congressional representation. The changes were in effect for the U.S. elections in 2012.

Changes following the 2020 censuses

Apportionment results were released on April 26, 2021:

List of apportionments 
The size of the U.S. House of Representatives has increased and decreased as follows

See also
 List of U.S. states by population
 List of U.S. states by historical population (tables of state populations since 1790)
 Electoral vote changes between United States presidential elections

Notes
 Delegate counts in italics represent temporary counts assigned by Congress until the next decennial census or by the U.S. Constitution in 1789 until the first U.S. census.
 Elections held in the year of a census use the apportionment determined by the previous census.

Citations

References

Further reading

External links
 Congressional Apportionment by the U.S. Census Bureau

Congressional apportionment
Apportionment
Congressional apportionment
Congressional apportionment
Redistricting in the United States
Apportionment by country